Sally Jane Axworthy, MBE (born Sally Jane Hinds, 1 September 1964) is a British diplomat who was formerly the British Ambassador to the Holy See.

Life
Axworthy is the widow of Michael Axworthy, whom she married in 1996 and who died in March 2019, and has four children. She graduated in with a degree in modern history from Oxford University, with a specialisation in economics and law.

She joined the Foreign Office in 1986. In 1987 she was a Desk Officer covering Hungary and what was then Czechoslovakia. From 1988 until 1989 she spent a year learning Russian in preparation for her posting to Moscow in 1989 as a Third Secretary, Commercial. She remained in Moscow until 1991 when she was transferred to Kiev as a Second Secretary, Economic.

From 1993 to 1994 Axworthy returned to London as Head of the Political Section in the UN Directorate. After this, until 1996 she was seconded to the German Foreign Ministry returning to the FCO but remaining in Germany in Berlin as First Secretary. For two years from 1998 she was head of the Turkey, Cyprus & Malta Section before being posted to Government Office South West as assistant director.

From 2011 to 2015 she returned to London where she worked in the FCO on African affairs.

On 19 September 2016, Axworthy presented her letter of credence to Pope Francis, beginning her mission to the Holy See.

She ended her mission in July 2021.

References

 

Living people
1964 births
Alumni of the University of Oxford
Ambassadors of the United Kingdom to the Holy See
Members of HM Diplomatic Service
Members of the Order of the British Empire
British women ambassadors
20th-century British diplomats
21st-century British diplomats